The 1962 NBA playoffs was the postseason tournament of the National Basketball Association's 1961-62 season. The tournament concluded with the Eastern Division champion Boston Celtics defeating the Western Division champion Los Angeles Lakers 4 games to 3 in the NBA Finals.

The Celtics won their 4th straight title to become the first (and as of 2022, only) NBA team to do so. Boston's Game 7 victory occurred in OT, with Bill Russell tying his own Finals record with 40 rebounds.

This was the second NBA Finals played between the Celtics and Lakers, but it was the first one the Lakers played in since they moved to Los Angeles.

Though the NBA has existed since 1947, this is the earliest NBA Finals played between two teams that still reside in their present (2022) locations.

Bracket

Division Semifinals

Eastern Division Semifinals

(2) Philadelphia Warriors vs. (3) Syracuse Nationals

This was the ninth playoff meeting between these two teams, with the 76ers/Nationals winning five of the first eight meetings.

Western Division Semifinals

(2) Cincinnati Royals vs. (3) Detroit Pistons

This was the seventh playoff meeting between these two teams, with both teams splitting the first six meetings.

Division Finals

Eastern Division Finals

(1) Boston Celtics vs. (2) Philadelphia Warriors

 Paul Arizin's final NBA game; Sam Jones hits the series-winning shot with 2 seconds left.

This was the third playoff meeting between these two teams, with the Celtics winning the first two meetings.

Western Division Finals

(1) Los Angeles Lakers vs. (3) Detroit Pistons

This was the ninth playoff meeting between these two teams, with the Lakers winning seven of the first eight meetings.

NBA Finals: (E1) Boston Celtics vs. (W1) Los Angeles Lakers

 Jerry West steals Sam Jones' inbound pass and hit the game winning buzzer-beater.

 Elgin Baylor's 61 points sets a Finals record for an individual scorer in a game.

 Frank Selvy misses the championship-winning shot in regulation; Bill Russell's 40 rebounds ties his own Finals record in a single game.

This was the second playoff meeting between these two teams, with the Celtics winning first meeting when the Lakers were in Minneapolis.

References

External links
Basketball-Reference.com's 1962 NBA Playoffs page

National Basketball Association playoffs
Playoffs